S. juncea may refer to:

 Solidago juncea, a perennial plant
 Sowerbaea juncea, a perennial herb
 Stelis juncea, an epiphytic orchid
 Strelitzia juncea, a monocotyledonous plant